Purchase may refer to:

People 
Jack Purchase (born 1995), Australian basketball player
Ken Purchase (1939–2016), British politician
Louisianna Purchase (drag queen), American drag queen
William Purchase (died 1557), one of the Colchester Martyrs
Zac Purchase (born 1986), British rower
Robert Purchase (born 1985), a Jewish mechanical engineer from Ruislip, known for his award winning work relating to improving railhead adhesion on railways in both the UK and mainland Europe.

Places 

Jackson Purchase, a region in western Kentucky; locally called "The Purchase"
Purchase, New York, US

Territorial purchases in history 

Treaty of the Danish West Indies, a deal between Denmark and the United States in 1916
Alaska purchase, a deal between Russia and the United States in 1867
Gadsden Purchase, territory bought by the United States from Mexico in 1853 
Jackson Purchase (U.S. historical region), territory ceded to the United States by the Chickasaws in 1818
Louisiana Purchase, an acquisition by the United States of French territory in 1803
Walking Purchase, an agreement in 1737 between the Penn family and the Lenape-Delaware tribe of American Indians

Other uses 

Purchase (horse) (1916–1936), American thoroughbred racehorse
Purchase Records, American small record label started in 2000
SUNY Purchase, a public college in the State University of New York system
Purchase of commissions in the British Army, the practice from 1683 until 1871 of officers purchasing their army commissions

See also
Buy (disambiguation)
Purchasing